Mr. Kline and the Wizards of Time was an indie rock band from the Phoenix, Arizona area from 2003-2006 on Uncle Abbott Records.

Band history
Mr. Kline started in 2003 by Brandon Abbott and Jesse Mitchell after the breakup of The Hot Guy Band, the previous brainchild of Joe Ging and Brandon Abbott.  After Hellogoodbye frontman, Forrest Kline, offered his last name to use for the band, the previously unnamed project became a band.

The band incorporated a new mix of drum machines simultaneously with live drums, keyboards and guitars into catchy, up-beat pop songs. Having written a few songs, the band quickly recorded with friend and producer, [Bob Hoag], who offered to join the band as its third member.  Soon after recording a four-song EP consisting of "The Hungry Ghost", "The Antebellum", "The Education of Girl Town", and "The Music Heard and the Defeat/Victory at the Battle for Mars".

Soon after recording the EP, the band added members, Michael Porter and Andy Hiller.  Mr Kline would play a handful of shows as a four-piece, as it was usually not the case that all five members would be present for any particular show, because of commitments to their other bands.  

Jesse Mitchell left the band in 2004 and was replaced briefly by Jake Wiedmann and then Chad Staples.  Ryan Lower joined the band in 2005 first as art director, for designing all of the art the band used for any merchandise and its album, and then as a member of the band.

In 2005-2006, Mr. Kline gradually worked on its only full-length album for [Uncle Abbott Records] aptly titled, "[This Albums Cursed or These Soft Pipes, Play On]".  Having been convinced the album was in deed cursed, due to its incredibly torturous experience because of extenuating circumstances beyond the band's control, it was named so.  However, nearing the end of recording the album, a very pleasing product was accompanied by the fact that member and producer, Bob Hoag, had learned he would be a father.  This was explained on the back of the album.  Thus, the band opted to add the alternative album title, "These Soft Pipes, Play On", along with alternative song titles.

Shortly after releasing the album and having gotten closure on the experience, the band dismantled in order to focus on other passions.  Members, Michael Porter and Andy Hiller formed The Wizards of Time, while Bob Hoag focused on producing and his other bands, and other members pursued academia.  In July 2007, members Brandon Abbott, Bob Hoag, and Ryan Lower recorded a four-song EP under the moniker, Gentlemen.

Members
None of the members of Mr. Kline and the Wizards of Time were credited as having played any particular instrument. Their roles constantly overlapped as the needs of the band changed per song.

Brandon Abbott
Jesse Mitchell
Bob Hoag
Michael Porter
Andy Hiller
Ryan Lower
Chad Staples
Jake Wiedmann

Discography
Mr. Kline produced 4 EPs, recorded at various studios, which it circulated at shows and on the internet prior to releasing its album. 

2003 - EP - "The Hungry Ghost EP"
2004 - EP - "Tribute to Duplow EP"
2005 - EP - "Airplanes and Butterknives EP"
2005 - EP - "Oh Tokyo EP"
2005 - LP - "This Albums Cursed or These Soft Pipes, Play On"

Indie rock musical groups from Arizona
Musical groups from Phoenix, Arizona